Bertie van Renen ( 29 August 1880 –  17 February 1942) was a South African international rugby union player who played as a utility back.

He made 2 appearances for South Africa against the British Lions in 1903.

References

South African rugby union players
South Africa international rugby union players
1880 births
1942 deaths
Rugby union players from Cape Town
Western Province (rugby union) players